Prince Arnulf of Bavaria (6 July 1852 – 12 November 1907) was a member of the Bavarian Royal House of Wittelsbach and a General of Infantry.

Early life
Arnulf was born in Munich, Bavaria. He was the youngest son of Prince Regent Luitpold of Bavaria and his wife Archduchess Augusta of Austria.

Military career
As his older brothers, Arnulf joined the Bavarian army and became a regimental commander, reaching the rank Generaloberst. He fought with the Russian army in the Russo-Turkish War (1877–78) and was present at the Siege of Plevna.  From 1892 to 1903 he commanded the First Bavarian Army Corps.

In 1901 Arnulf represented his father Prince Regent Luitpold at the funeral of Queen Victoria of the United Kingdom.

Marriage and family
On  12 April 1882 Arnulf married Princess Therese of Liechtenstein, the daughter of Prince Alois II of Liechtenstein and Countess Franziska Kinsky. The wedding took place in the Palais Liechtenstein in Vienna, Austria. The couple had a son:

 Prince Heinrich of Bavaria (1884–1916)

Death
Arnulf died on  12 November 1907 in Venice, Italy. He is buried in the crypt of the Theatinerkirche in Munich, Bavaria.

Honours 
He received the following orders and decorations:

Ancestry

Notes

Further reading
 Jirí Louda and Michael MacLagan, Lines of Succession: Heraldry of the Royal Families of Europe, 2nd edition (London: Little, Brown and Company, 1999)
 Konrad Krafft von Dellmensingen and Friedrichfranz Feeser. Das Bayernbuch vom Weltkriege, 1914-1918. Chr. Belser AG, Verlagsbuchhandlung, Stuttgart 1930.
 Die Wittelsbacher: Geschichte unserer Familie. Prestel Verlag, München, 1979.

Princes of Bavaria
House of Wittelsbach
1852 births
1907 deaths
People from the Kingdom of Bavaria
Members of the Bavarian Reichsrat
Burials at the Theatine Church, Munich
Grand Crosses of the Military Merit Order (Bavaria)
Knights of the Golden Fleece of Austria
Grand Crosses of the Order of Saint Stephen of Hungary
Recipients of the Iron Cross, 2nd class
Recipients of the Order of St. George of the Fourth Degree